The 2013 6 Hours of Shanghai was an endurance auto race held at the Shanghai International Circuit in Shanghai, China on 9 November 2013.  The race was the seventh round of the 2013 FIA World Endurance Championship season.

The race was won by André Lotterer, Benoît Tréluyer and Marcel Fässler of Audi Sport Team Joest. Allan McNish, Tom Kristensen and Loïc Duval won the World Drivers' Championship at the event after finishing in third place.

Qualifying

Qualifying result
Pole position winners in each class are marked in bold.

Race

Race result
Class winners in bold. Cars failing to complete 70% of winner's distance marked as Not Classified (NC).

References

 

6 Hours of Shanghai
Shanghai
Shanghai